Aristobia vietnamensis is a species of beetle in the family Cerambycidae. It was described by Stephan von Breuning in 1972. It is known from Vietnam.

References

Lamiini
Beetles described in 1972